Richard Woodman (born 1944) is an English novelist and naval historian.

Richard Woodman may also refer to:

 Richard Woodman (martyr) (c. 1524–1557), Sussex martyr
 Richard Woodman (engraver) (1784–1859), English engraver and miniature portrait painter
 Richard Woodman (cricketer)